Eleuterio Recalde (unknown – unknown), was a Paraguayan chess player, Paraguayan Chess Championship winner (1960).

Biography
In the 1960s Eleuterio Recalde was one of Paraguay's leading chess players. He won Paraguayan Chess Championships in 1960. He was participant of international chess tournaments in Asunción (1960) and Montevideo (1961). In 1960, in São Paulo Eleuterio Recalde participated in World Chess Championship South American Zonal tournament.

Eleuterio Recalde played for Paraguay in the Chess Olympiad:
 In 1968, at second board in the 18th Chess Olympiad in Lugano (+3, =7, -3).

References

External links

Eleuterio Recalde chess games at 365chess.com

Year of birth missing
Year of death missing
Paraguayan chess players
Chess Olympiad competitors
20th-century chess players
20th-century Paraguayan people